The Oral Roberts Golden Eagles baseball team is the intercollegiate baseball team of Oral Roberts University. It plays in the NCAA Division I Summit League.  The team won the Mid-Con and Summit League regular season and tournament titles for 15 years straight between 1998 and 2012. Upon returning to the Summit League, the team repeated the feat in 2015 and 2016. In 2006, they advanced to the NCAA Super Regional.

Key moments

The ORU baseball team advanced to the College World Series in 1978 and has made 22 NCAA Tournament appearances overall.  In addition, ORU baseball made 15 consecutive NCAA Tournament appearances from 1998 to 2012 and played in the regional finals in 2002, 2004, 2005, 2006, 2008, 2009, and 2011, winning the 2006 Regional Championship.

Notable players

Mike Moore was an ORU standout from 1979–81 and first-round draft pick. He played 14 seasons in the big leagues and was selected an American League All-Star in 1989. He played in consecutive World Series with Oakland (1989,90), winning a World Championship in 1989.  Todd Burns (1982–84) was Moore's teammate in Oakland and helped the A's win three straight American League pennants (1988–90) and 1989 World Series.  Keith Lockhart (1985–86) played in the 1999 World Series as a member of the Atlanta Braves and helped that team win five consecutive National League Eastern Division titles. Tom Nieto (1981) played in the 1985 world Series with St. Louis Cardinals and won a World championship in 1987 as a member of the Minnesota Twins. Doug Bernier, Michael Hollimon and Steve Holm all made their Major League debuts in 2008.  Mike Mason, Keith Miller, Bob Zupcic, Larry Casian and Craig Colbert also played in the Major Leagues.

Notable coaches

Former head coach Larry Cochell guided ORU from 1977–86, leading the school to seven NCAA Regional appearances and the 1978 College World Series.  Former coach Sunny Golloway was one of the best skippers in the NCAA Division I, guiding the Golden Eagles to a 294–136 record and five NCAA Regional appearances in seven years at the helm. He was an assistant coach for Team USA in the summer of 2002.
 
As first year head coach in 2004, Rob Walton guided ORU to the nation's best winning percentage (.820) while also setting a Summit League Conference mark with a 50–11 overall record. The 2004 Golden Eagles were ranked in the Top 20 for 12 consecutive weeks, reaching a high of No. 13 in late May...Walton led ORU to its ninth consecutive Summit League Tournament title and the program's 18th NCAA Regional appearance in 2006. Walton also earned ABCA Midwest Region Coach of the Year honors after guiding the Golden Eagles to a regional championship and final Top 25 ranking in all three major, a program first. Walton also served as the head coach for USA Baseball's National Team during the summer of 2008.

J.L. Johnson Stadium

J.L. Johnson Stadium has been the home of Golden Eagles baseball since 1978.  It hosted its first game on March 6, 1978.

In 2008, a  facility was added which includes coaches offices, a state-of-the-art weight room and the Grand Slam Room in which boosters and fans can watch ORU games in a climate-controlled environment. The facility is located down the right-field line.

Johnson Stadium has been host to three NCAA Regionals (1978,1980,1981), 14 conference tournaments, and many All-Americans.  Many Major Leaguers have played at Johnson Stadium, including Roger Clemens, Joe Carter, Kirk Gibson, Tony Gwynn, Keith Lockhart, Pete Incaviglia, Kevin McReynolds, Mike Moore, and Robin Ventura.

H.A. Chapman Indoor Practice Facility  

The H.A. Chapman Indoor Practice Facility opened in the Fall of 2009. The  facility, located just west of J.L. Johnson Stadium, features indoor practices areas for both baseball and track & field programs. Built at a cost of $1.2 million, the facility was funded exclusively through private donations, including a generous lead gift from the H.A. and Mary K. Chapman Charitable Trust. The baseball portion of the facility features a regulation-sized infield, three pitching areas and three netted batting cages. The track & field area features a complete pole vault area, high jump pit and long jump & triple jump practice areas.

Mid-Continent Conference/Summit League achievements

 Overall Record of 567–222 (.719)
 12 Summit League Regular-Season Titles
 13 Summit League Tournament Titles
 13 NCAA post-season appearances
 2006 Regional Champion
 2002,2004,2005,2008, and 2009 NCAA Regional Runner-up
 Ranked as high as No. 23 nationally in 2008
 Ranked as high as No. 24 nationally in 2007
 Ranked as high as No. 14 nationally in 2006
 Ranked as high as No. 13 nationally in 2004
 Ranked as high as No. 20 nationally in 2002
 Ranked as high as No. 23 nationally in 1998
 Ranked No. 11 nationally in 1987 year end rankings
 21 All-Americans
 10 Freshman All-Americans
 4 Summit League Players of the Year
 11 Summit League Pitchers of the Year
 88 First Team All-Summit league selections
 42 Second Team All-Summit League selections
 70 Summit League All-Tournament selections
 13 Summit League Tournament MVPs

Excellence as tradition

The 2009–2010 academic year brought even more success. Baseball continued to rank among the nation's elite programs, winning its 13th straight Summit League Tournament crown and advancing to NCAA Regionals for the 22nd time. Four Golden Eagles were either drafted or signed contracts to play with Major League Baseball franchises.

NCAA First-Team All-Americans selections

 1977 Bob Volk
 1978 Bill Springman
 1981 Mike Moore
 1981 Tom Nieto
 1982 Keith Mucha
 1984 Todd Burns
 1999 Jeff Stallings
 2004 Dennis Bigley
 2008 Brian Van Kirk

Major League Baseball
Oral Roberts has had 133 Major League Baseball Draft selections since the draft began in 1965.

See also
 List of NCAA Division I baseball programs

References